Larry Moffett (November 5, 1954 - May 2, 2011) was an American basketball player who played for Horace Mann High, Gary, Indiana (1973 only), Murray State University (1973–75), Compton Community College (1975–76) and the University of Nevada, Las Vegas (1976–77), before being drafted by the Houston Rockets in the 1977 NBA draft. However, he played only one NBA season, and appeared in a total of 20 games.

References
Profile —TheDraftReview.com
Profile — Basketball-Reference.com

1954 births
2011 deaths
American expatriate basketball people in Belgium
American expatriate basketball people in France
American expatriate basketball people in Italy
American expatriate basketball people in Spain
American men's basketball players
Basketball players from Alabama
Fulgor Libertas Forlì players
Gijón Baloncesto players
Hawaii Volcanos players
Houston Rockets draft picks
Houston Rockets players
JA Vichy players
Junior college men's basketball players in the United States
Juvecaserta Basket players
Montana Golden Nuggets players
Murray State Racers men's basketball players
Power forwards (basketball)
Sportspeople from Mobile, Alabama
UNLV Runnin' Rebels basketball players